The 2013 Missouri Valley Conference baseball tournament was held from May 21 through 25.  All eight teams will participate in the double-elimination tournament, which was held at Illinois State's Duffy Bass Field in Normal, Illinois.  The winner of the tournament will earn the conference's automatic bid to the 2013 NCAA Division I baseball tournament.

Seeding and format
The league's eight teams were seeded based on conference winning percentage.  The teams will play a two-bracket, double-elimination format tournament, with the winner of each bracket then playing a single-elimination final.

Results

All-Tournament Team
The following players were named to the All-Tournament Team.

Most Outstanding Player
Wichita State outfielder Garrett Bayliff was named the tournament's Most Outstanding Player.

References

Missouri Valley Conference Baseball Tournament
Missouri Valley Conference baseball tournament
Tournament
Missouri Valley Conference baseball tournament
Baseball in Illinois
College sports in Illinois
Sports in Bloomington–Normal